Emblem Road (foaled April 20, 2018), is an American-bred Thoroughbred racehorse.

He won the 2022 Saudi Cup under Panamanian jockey Wigberto S. Ramos as an 80-1 outsider. He ran in the 2023 Saudi Cup.

References

2018 racehorse births
Saudi Cup winners